Dieschitz (Slovene Deščice ) is an Austrian village in the municipality of Velden am Wörthersee, Villach,

Geography 

Dieschitz has two parts: Unterdieschitz = Dieschitz in the strict sense and Oberdieschitz.

Population 

According to the 2001 census, Dieschitz has a population of 122 inhabitants. Some of the inhabitants are (still) bilingual. Censuses of the spoken language gave the following numbers of Slovenian speakers (percentages fluctuate although there has been no notable migration):
1951: 79.0%
1961: 53.1%
1971: 39.3%
1981: 16.8%
1991: 26.2%
2001: 15.4%

Economy
The village bar and the brick factory closed in the 1950s, the store in 1970, and the carpentry workshop in 1996. The inhabitants, in the past mostly farmers, have to travel for work to Villach or Klagenfurt, and a few have found work nearby in St. Egyden, Schiefling am See or Velden.

Notable residents 
 Anton Wornig, composer
 Stanko Finžgar, member of the International Brigades
 Ernest Gröblacher, director of the Chamber of Agriculture of  Carinthia
 Franz Richau, member of the Federal Council of Austria

Villages in Carinthia (state)